Quindarious "Smoke" Monday (born February 19, 2000) is an American football safety for the New Orleans Saints of the National Football League (NFL). He played college football at Auburn.

High school career 
Monday attended Carver High School in Atlanta, Georgia. Monday was a four-star recruit and the sixth ranked athlete in the class of 2018. Monday decided to attend Auburn University over various Power 5 offers.

College career 
As a freshman, Monday totaled 13 tackles, two sacks, and one interception. Monday's first career start was against Ole Miss, where he was almost ejected for targeting. In his sophomore season, Monday recorded 20 tackles, one sack, and one interception that was returned for a touchdown in the 2019 Iron Bowl. Monday played in all 11 of Auburn's games in 2020 and recorded 64 tackles, one sack, one forced-fumble, and two interceptions. He had a 100-yard interception return for a touchdown in a 30–17 victory over Tennessee. He was named to the Second-team All-SEC. In Monday's senior season, he tallied 58 tackles, two sacks, and one interception. The interception was a pick six tying Monday for the Auburn record for most interceptions returned for a touchdown in Auburn history with 3. At the regular season's end, Monday announced he would declare for the 2022 NFL Draft following the Tiger's bowl game. In his final collegiate game, Monday would have five tackles before being ejected for targeting.

Professional career 

Monday signed with the New Orleans Saints as an undrafted free agent on April 30, 2022.

On August 2, 2022, Monday suffered a torn ACL during practice, which prematurely ended his season. He was placed on injured reserve on August 5, 2022.

References

External links 
 New Orleans Saints bio
 Auburn Tigers Bio

Living people
Auburn Tigers football players
Players of American football from Atlanta
American football safeties
New Orleans Saints players
2000 births